X the Unknown is a 1956 British science fiction horror film directed by Leslie Norman and starring Dean Jagger and Edward Chapman. It was made by the Hammer Film Productions company and written by Jimmy Sangster. The film is significant in that "it firmly established Hammer's transition from B-movie thrillers to out-and-out horror/science fiction" and, with The Quatermass Xperiment (1955) and Quatermass 2 (1957), completes "an important trilogy containing relevant allegorical threads revealing Cold War anxieties and a diminishing national identity resulting from Britain's decrease in status as a world power".

Plot
The film takes place in the Lochmouth region of Scotland, near Glasgow. Members of a group of soldiers are taking turns using a Geiger counter to find a small and harmless hidden source of radioactivity in a wide pit area. Private Lansing (Kenneth Cope) finds another mysterious source of radiation where ground water starts to boil. As the other soldiers begin to run, there is an explosion. Lansing, who was closest to the explosion, dies of radiation burns while another soldier has bad radiation burns to his back. At the site of the explosion, there is a Y-shaped crack in the ground with no apparent bottom. Dr. Royston (Dean Jagger), from a nearby Atomic Energy Laboratory at Lochmouth, is called in to investigate, along with Mr. "Mac" McGill (Leo McKern), who runs security at the UK Atomic Energy Commission.

That night, a local boy, on a dare from his friend, goes to a tower on the marshes, where he sees a horrific off-camera sight. He refuses to tell his friend what has happened but continues running. The friend follows. Royston investigates the tower and finds an old man inside who had a canister of a formerly radioactive material, now drained of radioactivity. The boy dies the next day from radiation burns.

Shortly afterwards, a young doctor named Unwin (Neil Hallett) is having an intimate encounter with a nurse (Marianne Brauns) in a radiation lab at the hospital when something off-camera causes him to collapse and begin to melt, eventually reducing him to a charred corpse while leaving the nurse screaming and driven out of her mind.

Royston hypothesizes that a form of life that existed in distant prehistory when the Earth's surface was largely molten had been trapped by the crust of the Earth as it cooled; every 50 years there is a tidal surge that these creatures feel, which causes them to try to reach the surface in order to find food from radioactive sources.

Two soldiers (Anthony Newley and Ian MacNaughton) have been left to guard the pit. One goes to investigate a mysterious glow in the pit. The other one hears his screams and goes to investigate. He shoots at something off-camera, but is killed. The next day, Royston's colleague Elliott (William Lucas) volunteers to be lowered into the crack, and on his way down sees the burned remains of one of the soldiers. Farther down, he sees the monster, still off-camera, and his compatriots race to get him back to the surface again before the monster can reach him.

The army uses flamethrowers and explosives in an attempt to kill the creature, then seals the crack with concrete. Royston points out that the monster broke through miles of earth to get to the surface, so a few feet of concrete will be nowhere near enough to stop it. Meanwhile, he continues with his pet experiment, looking for a way to neutralize radiation using radio waves tuned to a certain frequency. The monster comes out again that night; it is shown to be an amorphous glowing mass. Some distance away, a car with four people in it is badly burned and all occupants are reported as having been melted.

The thing travels to Lochmouth Atomic Energy Laboratory to get the cobalt being used there. The Lochmouth inhabitants hide in a chapel as the monster approaches them. The creature raids the nuclear facility before the authorities can remove the radioactive cobalt to a safe distance. As a result, the creature grows even larger. As it returns through the village of Lochmouth, it narrowly misses the chapel and a little girl who has accidentally been left outside.

Royston and McGill hypothesize that the creature will move through the centre of the nearby city of Inverness, to reach another source of radioactive material. Royston has some success with his anti-radiation device, which neutralizes a small container of radioactive material, but causes it to explode violently in the process. With no time left for further experimentation or consideration of safety, they set up two large "scanners" on lorries, and use a canister of cobalt as bait to lure the monster from the crack where it is hidden. The idea works, but Elliott in the jeep carrying the bait barely escapes with his life when the vehicle becomes stuck in mud while leading the monster into scanner range. The jeep makes it to a safe distance, enough for the scanners to do their job, and the creature is neutralized and explodes a sufficient distance from the observers to avoid further injury or death. As the team approaches the crack from which the monster had emerged, however, a second, more powerful explosion occurs unexpectedly, knocking several of the team off their feet, but otherwise leaving them uninjured. Puzzled, the team continues approaching the crack, presumably to make further tests, as the film comes to an end.

Cast

 Dean Jagger as Dr. Adam Royston
 Leo McKern as "Mac" McGill
 Edward Chapman as John Elliott
 William Lucas as Peter Elliott
 Peter Hammond as Lieutenant Bannerman
 Anthony Newley as Lance Corporal "Spider" Webb
 Ian MacNaughton as Haggis
 Michael Ripper as Sergeant Harry Grimsdyke
 Michael Brooke as Willie Harding
 Frazer Hines as Ian Osborne

 Norman Macowan as Old Tom
 John Harvey as Major Cartwright
 Edwin Richfield as Soldier Burned on Back
 Jane Aird as Vi Harding
 Neil Hallett as Unwin
 Kenneth Cope as Private Lansing
 Jameson Clark as Jack Harding
 Marianne Brauns as Zena, the Nurse
 Brown Derby as The Vicar
 Anthony Sagar as Security Man (uncredited)

Production
The film was originally intended by Hammer to be a sequel to the previous year's successful The Quatermass Xperiment, but writer Nigel Kneale refused permission for the character of Bernard Quatermass to be used.

The original director of the film was Joseph Losey, working under the name Joseph Walton – Losey was an American director who had moved to the UK after being placed on the Hollywood blacklist. Although Losey did begin shooting the film and some of his footage is included in the final cut, he was replaced by Leslie Norman due to illness. An alternative version is that Jagger refused to work with him because of his blacklisting.

Norman was borrowed from Ealing. He had just made his directorial debut with The Night My Number Came Up. He later said "I hated working at Hammer... because I never got on with Anthony Hinds."

Filming occurred at Bray Studios in Berkshire. Half the film's budget was provided by Sol Lesser, a producer for RKO Pictures. This amount, $30,000, went towards the salary for Dean Jagger. Nonetheless, the American distribution deal between Hammer and RKO fell through due to the latter company's pending demise, and the film was distributed in the U.S. by Warner Bros.

Critical reception
Variety wrote that the film was "a highly imaginative and fanciful [melodrama]....There's little letup in the action, and suspense angles are kept constantly to the forefront". In the UK the Daily Telegraph said it was "good, grisly fun" and "a welcomed change from interplanetary yarns" was the verdict of Films and Filming.

See also
 The Blob

References

External links

 
 
 
 
 

1956 films
1950s science fiction horror films
1950s monster movies
British science fiction horror films
British monster movies
Films directed by Leslie Norman
Films scored by James Bernard
Films set in Scotland
Films shot at Bray Studios
Hammer Film Productions horror films
Films with screenplays by Jimmy Sangster
1950s English-language films
1950s British films
British black-and-white films